Mission Harbour station is a railway station in Mission, British Columbia, Canada, located along CPR's Cascade subdivision. It sits just north of the Mission Railway Bridge at Harbour Avenue.

The station is served by Via Rail's The Canadian as a flag stop (48 hours advance notice required). The station is only served by eastbound trains towards Toronto. Westbound trains call at Abbotsford railway station along the CN Railway tracks, on the other side of the Fraser River. This split in service between Vancouver and Ashcroft is due to CN and CPR utilizing directional running through the Thompson and Fraser Canyons.

Footnotes

External links 
Via Rail Station Description

Via Rail stations in British Columbia
Mission, British Columbia